The Lonesome Sisters, Sarah Hawker and Debra Clifford, are an American acoustic music duo. They were voted Best Acoustic Duo of 2006 by Gibson Guitars. At Merlefest 2004 they performed and they won best country song in the Merlefest Chris Austin Songwriting Contest for Sarah's song, "Forgiveness." They have recorded six CDs on their own record label, Tin Halo Music. "Follow Me Down" was voted best original song in the Clifftop WV Appalachian Stringband Festival Songwriting Contest.  

Sarah Hawker learned about traditional Appalachian singing from her aunt Ginny Hawker, traditional Appalachian singer, and her uncle Tracy Schwarz of the New Lost City Ramblers, as well as her grandfather, Ben Hawker, beloved Primitive Baptist singer and  teacher, and teller of tall tales. Along with singing and songwriting, she plays guitar, clawhammer banjo and harmonium. 

Debra Clifford has toured with Ginny Hawker & Tracy Schwarz, and is also a member of Old Buck, an old time music stringband with Riley Baugus on Banjo; Emily Schaad, fiddle; and Sabra Guzman, bass. The Old Buck CD was chosen by Scott Nygaard, editor of Acoustic Guitar magazine, as one of the best albums of 2013. 

In 2012, Sarah and Debra recorded three new CDs: Deep Water, Lonesome Scenes with Riley Baugus, and Long Time Sun released as Sarah Hawker, which is a Kudalini Yoga CD.

Reviews
"Crystalline harmonies and mournful tunes..." The Boston Globe 8/05 on the Lonesome Sisters at the Newport Folk Festival.

"My listeners and I love the Lonesome Sisters music. Warm, authentic and beautifully crafted, the albums are a joy". -Bob Harris, BBC RADIO 2

On The Lonesome Sisters with Riley Baugus CD 2: "The Lonesome Sisters' sound is straight out of Kentucky or West Virginia. Intricate acoustic guitar, upright bass and shimmering harmonies fill these beautiful bluegrass ballads. Performing Songwriter Magazine Sept/Oct 2005, Top 12 DIY Picks

On The Lonesome Sisters CD 1: "The warm plainitive voices of Sarah Hawker and Debra Clifford were simply destined to be entwined. Chad Crumm's production makes you feel like you are in the room with them. Their own compositions are indistinguishable in spirit and quality from the traditionals or Stanley Brothers songs here. Instrumental accompaniment by Clifford, Crumm, and Rose Sinclair (Heartbeats, Planet Zydeco) is all the more compelling for its restraint. "Omie Wise" features Hawker's voice unaccompanied and is the most chilling rendition I have heard. (BC) Dirty Linen Magazine August/September '05

"The Lonesome Sisters are  vocalist Sarah Hawker and Debra Clifford on vocals and guitar. If the name Hawker seems familiar, Sarah is the niece of master traditional vocalist Ginny Hawker. Sarah was also one of the recipients of the prestigious Chris Austin Songwriter's Award at Merlefest 2004. ... Debra Clifford and Sarah Hawker have produced two recordings of great tenderness and beauty. Anyone who is a fan of wonderful harmony singing and well-written songs will truly enjoy the work of The Lonesome Sisters".-Tom Druckenmiller, Sing Out! Fall 2004

References 

Joan Anderman, "Rockers add zest, but folk still rules Newport festival", Boston Globe, archived 28 November 2013. 
Ari Surdoval, "The Lonesome Sisters: Long gone lonesome blues", Gibson Guitars, archived 28 November 2013.
Frank Goodman, "The Lonesome Sisters", Pure Music, archived 28 November 2013.

External links 
Lonesome Sisters official website

American musical duos